The Gadabedji Total Reserve  (Réserve totale de Faune du Gadabedji) is a nature reserve in the central region of Niger. It is a Total Faunal Reserve  IUCN type IV, covering some 76,000 hectares within the northern tip of the Maradi Region, just north of the town of Dakoro, and south of the border with the Agadez Region.
The reserve is also recognized biosphere reserve by the Unesco since 2017.

Geography
The reserve, originally established 25 April 1955, by Law No. 3120/S.E. is also a 'fôret classée'.  It covers a small area of Sahelian wooded steppe and grassland, south of the Aïr Mountains.

Animal population
Gadabedji Total Reserve was planned to protect Sahelo-Saharan antelopes, mainly the Scimitar-horned Oryx and Dama Gazelle populations which have largely disappeared due to local population pressures. In the 1940s, the area was along an important migration route for the animals from the Tenere desert to the Adar in the south of the country. It remains a transhumance route for domesticated cattle and camels, as well as some wild Dorcas and Ménas Gazelles  The reserve is a proposed site of future Oryx reintroduction.

References

unep-wcmc site record
World Database on Protected Areas / UNEP-World Conservation Monitoring Centre (UNEP-WCMC), 2008.
Biodiversity and Protected Areas-- Niger, Earth Trends country profile (2003)

National parks of Niger
Protected areas established in 1955
Biosphere reserves of Niger
1955 establishments in Niger